Regional elections were held on 10 September 2017 in six federal subjects of Russia.

Race summary

See also
 2017 Russian gubernatorial elections

External links 
 Website of the Central Election Commission of the Russian Federation

References

2017 elections in Russia
Regional elections in Russia
September 2017 events in Russia